"Is Anybody Out There?" is a song co-written and performed by Somalia-born rapper K'naan, featuring Canadian singer-songwriter Nelly Furtado, from his first extended play More Beautiful Than Silence. The song was first released as a digital download in the United States on January 24, 2012, before being physically issued in Germany on March 30. The single made its chart debut on the Canadian Hot 100 at number 67 and peaked at number 14. It was most successful in New Zealand, where it reached the top of the RIANZ chart on the week of March 12, 2012; it was Furtado's fourth number-one single in New Zealand.

Background

"Is Anybody Out There?" was produced by Sham & Motesart. Lyrically, the track speaks about self-assurance, separation, and loneliness. K'naan raps about the character Mary, comparing her to American actress Cameron Diaz; "Something ’bout Mary, never won a pageant / Never felt pretty, never looked like Cameron / Diaz was her last name, always been abandoned / Keep your head up baby girl, this your anthem." It is the second time the duo have collaborated, the first being "Going Away". The video for "Is Anybody Out There?" was directed by Chris Robinson in Toronto, Ontario, Canada during the first week of February. The plot follows two characters named Mary and Adam. K'naan narrates their journeys through rap. Mary struggles with her appearance and being judged by her peers the video begins with her getting kicked out of a mini mart for loitering. Adam struggles with drugs and a father who is never there for him. K'naan and Furtado are shot in a separate scene located in the desolate woods.

Critical reception
"Is Anybody Out There?" obtained mixed reviews by its critics. The track received negative reviews by Jody Rosen of Rolling Stone. Rosen gave the collaboration a mere one and a half out of five stars, criticizing the song's lyrical content.

Track listing
 Digital download
 "Is Anybody Out There?" — 3:58

 CD single
 "Is Anybody Out There?" — 3:58
 "Is Anybody Out There?" (Cutmore Radio Edit) — 3:27

Chart performance

Weekly charts

Year-end charts

Certifications

References

External links
 

K'naan songs
2012 singles
Songs written by Nelly Furtado
Number-one singles in New Zealand
Music videos directed by Chris Robinson (director)
Nelly Furtado songs
Songs written by Lil' Eddie
Songs written by K'naan
2012 songs
A&M Octone Records singles
Songs about bullying
Songs about drugs
Songs about loneliness